Colonel Thomas Bernard (September 1816 – 13 December 1882) was an Anglo-Irish British Army officer and official.

Bernard was the son of Thomas Bernard and Lady Catherine Henrietta Hely-Hutchinson. He was a commissioned officer in the 12th Royal Lancers, attaining the rank of lieutenant-colonel. He served as High Sheriff of King's County in 1837. Bernard was appointed Lord Lieutenant of King's County on 17 December 1867, serving in the role until his death. He was Colonel of the King's County Militia. Bernard was the owner of Castle Bernard, County Offaly.

He had an illegitimate daughter with actress Sarah Fairbrother. The daughter, Louisa Catherine, was born on 22 March 1839, and baptised as if she were legitimate, with the surname Bernard (although her birth was not registered under either Bernard or Fairbrother). Bernard made provision for her at the time of her marriage. Louisa Catherine died without issue in 1919.

References

1816 births
1882 deaths
12th Royal Lancers officers
19th-century Anglo-Irish people
High Sheriffs of King's County
Lord-Lieutenants of King's County